Olympic Gold may refer to:
 Olympic medal, the highest class of which is gold
 List of multiple Olympic gold medalists, athletes who have won multiple gold medals
 Gold Olympic Order, the highest grade of the Olympic Order
 Olympic Gold (video game), 1992 video game
 Olympic Gold Quest, an Indian not-for-profit company